The Ministry of Civil Aviation of Egypt (MCA) is the ministry in charge of civil aviation in Egypt.

Duties
The ministry sets civil aviation regulations, sets airworthiness and all flight rules, and air standards that must be met, making amendments, as needed. It ensures Egyptian airline and flight operations follow safety rules such as those put forth by International Aviation - European Common Aviation Area (ECAA).

One of the ministry's most important duties is to conduct investigations of airplane crashes and to provide progress reports on such investigations.
Then the ministry negotiates the resumption of flights from the country that suffered the airline crash to or from Egypt.

The ministry is supposed to manage the fair competition between state-run airlines such as EgyptAir and private airlines, of which there are 14 but private airlines complain that EgyptAir has monopolized the industry.

History
The ministry was established in 2002 by separating out the responsibilities for civil aviation from the Ministry of Transport and Communications. The Ministry of Civil Aviation is headquartered in Cairo.

The Egyptian Civil Aviation Authority (ECAA), subordinate to the ministry, is the civil aviation authority of Egypt.

In early 2018, the Ministry of Civil Aviation, the Ministry of Tourism and other interested stakeholders discussed the roadblocks that ought to be addressed if the country is to develop the tourism sector near Taba, Egypt, where there is a small airport.

Ministers
Ahmed Abdel Rahman Nasser (2002) 
Ahmed Shafiq (2002–2011) 
Ibrahim Manaa (2011-2011) 
Lotfi Mustafa Kamal (2011-2012) 
Hussein Massoud (2012) 
Alaa Ashour (2012) (announced for two hours but never sworn in)
Samir Imbabi (2012)  
Wael El-Maadawi (2012-2013)  
Abdel Aziz Fadel (2013–2014) 
Mohamed Hossam Kamal (2014-2016) 
Sharif Fathi (2016-2018) 
Younes Hamed (June, 2018-2019) 
Mohamed Manar (2019–present)

Investigations
 EgyptAir Flight 804 (2016-05-19)
 EgyptAir Flight 990 (1999-10-31)
 Flash Airlines Flight 604 (2004-01-03)
 Metrojet Flight 9268 (2015-10-31)

See also

Cabinet of Egypt

References

External links
Ministry of Civil Aviation official website 
Ministry of Civil Aviation official website (Archive)
 Egypt's Cabinet Database

2002 establishments in Egypt
Ministries established in 2002
Civil aviation authorities in Africa
Civil Aviation
Aviation organisations based in Egypt
Organizations investigating aviation accidents and incidents
Civil aviation in Egypt
Transport organisations based in Egypt